The 1982–83 Yugoslav Second League season was the 37th season of the Second Federal League (Croatian: Druga savezna liga, Serbian: Друга савезна лига, Slovenian: Druga zvezna liga, Macedonian: Втора сојузна лига, Albanian: Liga e Dytë te Jugosllavisë), the second level association football competition of SFR Yugoslavia, since its establishment in 1946. The league was contested in two regional groups (West Division and East Division), with 18 clubs each, two more than in the previous season.

West Division

Teams
A total of eighteen teams contested the league, including thirteen sides from the 1981–82 season, one club relegated from the 1981–82 Yugoslav First League and four sides promoted from the Inter-Republic Leagues played in the 1981–82 season. The league was contested in a double round robin format, with each club playing every other club twice, for a total of 34 rounds. Two points were awarded for wins and one point for draws.

NK Zagreb were relegated from the 1981–82 Yugoslav First League after finishing in the 18th place of the league table. The four clubs promoted to the second level were Maribor, Novi Sad, Radnik Bijeljina and Varteks.

League table

East Division

Teams
A total of eighteen teams contested the league, including thirteen sides from the 1981–82 season, one club relegated from the 1981–82 Yugoslav First League and four sides promoted from the Inter-Republic Leagues played in the 1981–82 season. The league was contested in a double round robin format, with each club playing every other club twice, for a total of 34 rounds. Two points were awarded for wins and one point for draws.

Teteks were relegated from the 1981–82 Yugoslav First League after finishing in the 17th place of the league table. The four clubs promoted to the second level were Lovćen, Pelister, Radnički Pirot and Vlaznimi Đakovica.

League table

See also
1982–83 Yugoslav First League
1982–83 Yugoslav Cup

References
General

Yugoslav Second League seasons
Yugo
2